Nadler is a German surname meaning "wire drawer". Notable people with the surname include:
 Allan L. Nadler (born 1954), Orthodox rabbi, professor and director of the Jewish Studies Program at Drew University, New Jersey
 Daniel Nadler, Canadian-born poet and technology entrepreneur
 David A. Nadler (born 1948), American organizational theorist
 Henrik Nádler (1901–1944), Hungarian international footballer
 Jeffrey P. Nadler (born 1950), Jewish American infectious diseases physician and HIV/AIDS expert
 Jerry Nadler (born 1947), American politician in U.S. House of Representatives
 Jo-Anne Nadler, British journalist, author and politician
 Judith Nadler, Jewish Romanian-American librarian and director of the University of Chicago Library
 Marissa Nadler (born 1981), American musician and recording artist
 Mark Nadler, Jewish American cabaret performer, actor and comedic pianist
 Steven Nadler (born 1958), Jewish American philosopher
 Tilo Nadler (born 1941), German primatologist
 Jonathan Nadler (born 1980), Canadian entrepreneur 
 Fictional figures
 Bernard Nadler, character  from the ABC television series Lost, husband of Rose
 Karen Nadler, character from the TNT television series Falling Skies
Rose Nadler, character  from the ABC television series Lost, wife of Bernard

German-language surnames
Jewish surnames
Yiddish-language surnames